KDDR (1220 AM, 95.9 FM, "The Tornado") is a radio station licensed to Oakes, North Dakota.  The station is owned by Robert Ingstad, Tallie Colville, and Todd Ingstad, through licensee i3G Media, Inc., with a country music format throughout the day, and is Southeastern North Dakota's sports leader, as an affiliate of the Minnesota Twins, Minnesota Vikings, Minnesota Timberwolves and North Dakota State Bison football radio networks, and more than 100 high school sporting events a year, including High School Football, Basketball, Baseball, Volleyball, Wrestling and American Legion Baseball.

KDDR was honored more than 30 times between 2012 and 2018 by the North Dakota Broadcasters Association, Associated Press, and Midwest Broadcast Journalism Association; primarily for excellence in local sports coverage.

For many years, KDDR was a part of the Dakota County Radio Network, which featured programming primarily carried from KOVC in Valley City, North Dakota, and simulcast on KDAK in Carrington, North Dakota. On February 1, 2018, KDDR was rebranded as "The Tornado", with a deeper focus on the Oakes and surrounding areas, and the 'Dakota County' branding was officially retired.

The station was assigned the KDDR call letters by the Federal Communications Commission.

References

External links
News Dakota

DDR
Country radio stations in the United States
Dickey County, North Dakota
Radio stations established in 1953